Nahr-e Afadeleh (also Romanized as Nahr-e ʿAfādeleh) is a village in Minubar Rural District, Arvandkenar District, Abadan County, Khuzestan Province, Iran. At the 2006 census, its population was 375, in 64 families.

References 

Populated places in Abadan County